The Sweden national junior handball team is the national under–20 handball team of Sweden. Controlled by the Swedish Handball Federation, it represents Sweden in international matches.

Statistics

IHF Junior World Championship record
 Champions   Runners up   Third place   Fourth place

EHF European Junior Championship 
 Champions   Runners up   Third place   Fourth place

References

Men's national junior handball teams
Men
Handball